Captain John Smith and Pocahontas  is a 1953 American historical western film directed by Lew Landers. The distributor was United Artists. It stars Anthony Dexter, Jody Lawrance and Alan Hale.

While most scenes were filmed in Virginia's Blue Ridge Mountains region, exteriors were shot around Bronson Canyon. It depicts the foundation of the Jamestown Colony in Virginia by English settlers and the relationship between John Smith and Pocahontas. She married John Rolfe in real life. It is also known by the alternative title Burning Arrows. Regarded as a B movie, the film has gained a cult following.

Plot
Captain John Smith tells the story of Jamestown colony to the court of King James I. In 1607, the colonists have found more hardships than gold in Jamestown and Captain Wingfield is making plans to abandon the settlement. Smith, locked aboard the Godspeed escapes and swims to the river bank. He warns the camp of an Indian attack. The colonists repel the first attack. The Indians fire burning arrows into the camp then Smith orders John Rolfe to swim across the river swim and warn the ships. The settlers take cover during the second Indian attack which is repelled cannon fire from the ships. Smith is elected as leader of the colony and the settlers build a wooden stockade for protection. Rations are running out and it is discovered that the ships have gone. Smith goes on an expedition to make peace with Chief Powhatan where he meets Pocahontas briefly but is later captured by warriors. Before his execution, Pocahontas saves him. She is married to Smith to keep a peace between the settlers. The following day, a settler finds gold and tells Wingfield. He plans to fail the colony so that the gold will not be given to The Virginia Company. Smith returns with Indians who bring supplies and teach them how to grow crops. The next day, Macklin spots Wingfield hiding gold and giving guns to Opechanco's warriors but Turnbull kills him and Nataquas is blamed. Nataquas is lashed and given the blame for his death until Smith arrives. Wingfield tells Opechanco to attack and wipe out the colonists but to spare himself. The colonists repel the attack amid the fight Turnbull is killed by an arrow. Opechanco kills Nataquas, who planned to tell Chief Powhatan, and Pocahontas runs to Jamestown and tells Smith. To avenge Nataquas, Smith decided to fight Opechanco and kills him. Wingfield kills Davis for the gold and sets the gunpowder storehouse on fire. Smith fights him and escapes out of the hut as it explodes. The ships arrive and the doctor sends Smith to rest aboard the ship. Smith leaves Jamestown to sail back to England, leaving Rolfe in charge. After telling his story, Smith leaves the court of King James I, having told his story. The films ends with the statue of Pocahontas in London.

Cast
 Anthony Dexter – Captain John Smith 
 Jody Lawrance – Pocahontas (Matoaka) 
 Alan Hale Jr. – Fleming 
 Robert Clarke – John Rolfe
 Stuart Randall – Opechanco 
 James Seay – Edward Maria Wingfield  
 Philip Van Zandt – Davis 
 Shepard Menken – Nantaquas 
 Douglass Dumbrille – Chief Powhatan (Wahunsonacock)
 Anthony Eustrel – King James 
 Henry Rowland – Turnbull 
 Eric Colmar – Kemp
 William Cottrell – Macklin (uncredited)
 Francesca De Scaffa – Powhatan Maiden (uncredited)
 Joan Dixon – Powhatan Maiden (uncredited)
 Jack Kenny – Settler who Discovers Gold (uncredited)
 John Maxwell – Ship's Doctor (uncredited)
 Billy Wilkerson – Sub-Chief (uncredited)

Release
The film was issued on a double bill with The Steel Lady.

Reception

Due to the lower limit budget, the film proved to be unsuccessful both by critics and at the box office. Hal Erickson of AllMovie gave the film his lowest star rating.

References

External links

1953 films
American historical drama films
1953 Western (genre) films
American Western (genre) films
1950s English-language films
Films directed by Lew Landers
Films set in Virginia
Films set in England
Films set in London
Films set in the Powhatan Confederacy
Films shot in Los Angeles
Films shot in Virginia
Jamestown, Virginia
Films set in the 1600s
Films set in the 1610s
1950s historical drama films
Films about Native Americans
Films produced by Edward Small
Cultural depictions of Pocahontas
Cultural depictions of James VI and I
United Artists films
Films scored by Albert Glasser
1953 drama films
Films produced by Aubrey Wisberg
Films with screenplays by Aubrey Wisberg
1950s American films